Brien A. Cullen (born November 30, 1955) is an American  former college football coach. Cullen served as the head coach for the Worcester State Lancers from 1983 to 2019.

Career
Cullen graduated from Worcester State College with a Bachelor of Arts in 1977, and played club football there. In his final season, he captained the squad. He would return to school and complete a Master of Education in 1985.

Cullen was the head coach of Worcester State Club Football team from 1983 to 1984. In his first season, he led the squad to an 8-3 record, and then followed with an undefeated season and a 1984 National Club Championship. Worcester State was upgraded to varsity status in 1985 when they joined the NCAA Division III and then joined the New England Football Conference (NEFC) in the following year. He remained head coach for the Worcester State Lancers until his retirement in 2019, and was succeeded by Adam Peloquin, who played under Cullen from 2009 to 2012.

In 2022, Cullen was inducted into the Worcester State Lancers Hall of Fame.

Personal life
Cullen is married to his wife, Mary, and the couple resides in Westborough, Massachusetts. They have two children: Kelly and Casey. Casey is a 2006 Worcester State graduate, who played and coached football for the Lancers.

Head coaching record

References

External links
 Worcester State profile

1955 births
Living people
People from Westborough, Massachusetts
Worcester State Lancers football coaches
Worcester State Lancers football players
Worcester State University alumni
Worcester State University faculty